Qarayi (also Romanized as Qarāyī; also known as Qareh Evlī) is a village in Dasht Rural District, Silvaneh District, Urmia County, West Azerbaijan Province, Iran. At the 2006 census, its population was 96, in 17 families.

References 

Populated places in Urmia County